Layhigh is an unincorporated community in Butler County, in the U.S. state of Ohio.

The community was so named on account of its lofty elevation of 910 feet [277 m] above sea level.

References

Unincorporated communities in Butler County, Ohio
Unincorporated communities in Ohio